Balıkçı is a village in the Pazar District, Rize Province, in Black Sea Region of Turkey. Its population is 293 (2021).

History 
According to list of villages in Laz language book (2009), name of the village is Zelek. Most villagers are ethnically Laz.

Geography

References

Villages in Pazar District, Rize
Laz settlements in Turkey